Lev Markovich Shlosberg (born 30 July 1963, Pskov) is a Russian politician, human rights activist, journalist, chairman of the Pskov Oblast branch of Yabloko, and a member of its federal political committee.

Biography
Shlosberg is of Ashkenazi Jewish descent. He joined Yabloko in 1994, becoming head of the Pskov branch of the party in 1996. From 2011 to 2015 he was a member of the Pskov Oblast Assembly of Deputies.

He has gained fame in August 2014 when he made a publication for the newspaper «Pskovskaya guberniya», where he spread information about the suspicious deaths of troops of 76th Guards Air Assault Division, Leonid Kichatkin and Alexander Osipov. Shlosberg claimed they died fighting in the Donbass.

In 2015, Shlosberg was deprived of authority by a court and by vote of fellow deputies. Shlosberg claims this was politically motivated. That year, he ran for the post of chairman of the democratic party Yabloko. He was defeated by Emilia Slabunova in the second round.

On 4 July 2016 he announced he was running for Parliament, in that year's State Duma Election, but lost the election in his constituency, coming in fifth with around 6% of the vote. Nonetheless, that same election, Yabloko won one seat in the Pskov Oblast Assembly of Deputies, and Shlosberg returned to the legislature.

In 2021, Shlosberg decided to run in the 2021 State Duma Elections, again as a candidate of Yabloko. However this time he is running in the Khovrino constituency in Moscow, instead of his home district of Pskov.

He also ran in the simultaneous Pskov Oblast Assembly elections. On 3 August 2021 his registration as a candidate was declined, due to alleged links with banned Anti-Corruption Foundation. However, on the next day he was registered, due to the fact that the court decision to ban Anti-Corruption Foundation was not yet final.

Regarding State Duma elections, however, on 9 August 2021 Moscow city court annulled his registration as a candidate, also due to alleged links with Anti-Corruption Foundation. Then he was also excluded from the federal Yabloko party list.

In April 2022, following the increased repression after the 2022 Russian invasion of Ukraine, Russian police filed charges against him and his wife for having "discredited" the Russian military.

Electoral history

Notes

References

External links
 Official site 
 Official Twitter

1963 births
21st-century Russian politicians
Living people
People from Pskov
Jewish Russian politicians
Russian bloggers
Russian Ashkenazi Jews
Russian Jews
Russian journalists
Russian YouTubers
Yabloko politicians
Russian activists against the 2022 Russian invasion of Ukraine